Chen is a common Chinese-language surname and one of the most common surnames in Asia. It is the most common surname in Taiwan (2010) and Singapore (2000). Chen is also the most common family name in Guangdong, Zhejiang, Fujian, Macau, and Hong Kong. It is the most common surname in Xiamen, the ancestral hometown of many overseas Hoklo.

Chen was listed 10th in the Hundred Family Surnames poem, in the verse 馮陳褚衛 (Feng Chen Chu Wei).

In Cantonese, it is usually romanized as Chan (as in Jackie Chan), most widely used by those from Hong Kong. Chan is also widely used in Macao and Malaysia. It is also sometimes spelled Chun. In many Southern Min dialects (including dialects of Hainan, Fujian, and Taiwan), the name is pronounced Tan, while in Teochew, it is pronounced Tang. In Hakka and Taishanese, the name is spelled Chin. In Wu it is pronounced Zen or Tchen.

In Vietnam, this surname is written as Trần (in Quốc Ngữ) and is 2nd most common. In Thailand, this surname is the most common surname of Thai Chinese and is often pronounced according to Teochew dialect as Tang. In Cambodia, this surname is transliterated as Taing. In Japanese, the surname is transliterated Chin (ちん). In Korean it is transliterated Jin or Chin (진).

In Indonesia, the surname is sometimes transliterated as Hartanto.

Chen is 5th most common in mainland China, but 4th most common in the world due to Chen's larger overseas population. With all its various spellings and pronunciations, there are around 80-100 million people surnamed 陳 / 陈 worldwide.

The surname Cheng (程) is sometimes romanized as Chen (e.g. John S. Chen). Another less common Chinese surname 諶 / 谌 (Shen) can also be romanized as Chen.

Character 
The Chinese character 陳 / 陈 means 'to describe' (陈述) or 'ancient'. It is a combination of the radical 阝and the character 東 / 东 which means 'East'.

History

Chen descends from the legendary sage king Emperor Shun from around 2200 BC via the surname Gui.

A millennia after Emperor Shun, when King Wu of Zhou established the Zhou dynasty, he enfeoffed his son-in-law Gui Man, also known as Duke Hu of Chen or Chen Hugong (陈胡公). Chen Hugong, a descendant of Emperor Shun, found the State of Chen in modern Huaiyang County, Henan Province. In 479 BC, Chen was absorbed by Chu and became the Chu capital. The people of Chen adopted the name of their former state as their surname.

At the end of the Qin dynasty, Chen Sheng initiated the Chen Sheng Wu Guang uprising that overthrew the Qin and paved the way for the Han dynasty, one of China's golden ages.

During the Northern and Southern dynasties period (420–589), Chen Baxian established the Chen dynasty (557–589), the fourth and the last of the Southern dynasties, which was eventually absorbed by the Sui dynasty.

During this period, the nomadic Xianbei people had systematically assimilated into China's agrarian culture and adopted Han Chinese surnames under the state directives of Emperor Xiaowen of Northern Wei. The Xianbei subjects whose surname of "侯莫陳" (Hóumòchén) were converted to "陳" (Chen).

Some descendants of Chen migrated to Vietnam (Dai Viet) and established the Trần dynasty, a golden age in Vietnam. Their original home was Fujian, and they migrated under Trần Kinh (陳京 Chén Jīng). Trần Thái Tông (陈太宗 Chen Taizong) became the founding emperor of the Tran dynasty, and his descendants would rule Vietnam for more than a century, expanding Vietnam's territory and promoting developments in language, chu nom, culture, and art. Certain members of the clan could still speak Chinese, like when a Yuan dynasty envoy had a meeting with the Chinese-speaking Tran Prince Trần Quốc Tuấn in 1282.

During the Yuan–Ming transition, Chen Youliang founded the Chen Han dynasty, which helped overthrow Yuan rule and pave the way for the Ming dynasty.

In the 20th century, Chen Duxiu cofounded the Chinese Communist Party and became its first general secretary, but was eventually expelled from the party and condemned by Mao due to advocating Trotskyism.

Distribution
Chen is the 5th most common surname in mainland China (around 70 million) and 4th most common in the world (around 80–100 million, including all its variants like Chan, Tan, Tran).

A 2013 study found that it was the 5th most common surname, shared by 61,300,000 people or 4.610% of the population, with the province with the most being Guangdong.

According to 2018 census, it was 5th most common in mainland China at around 63 million, but 4th most common surname in the world with 80–100 million people. It is the most common Chinese surname overseas.

In 2019 Chen was again the fifth most common surname in mainland China. It is the most common surname in the southern provinces of Zhejiang, Fujian, and Guangdong.

Hong Kong has around 700,000 using the spelling "Chan" and 61,000 using the spelling "Chen", so in total around 700,000–800,000 Chen (陈), which ranks first in Hong Kong.

In Thailand, last names are more unique therefore the Chinese last name Chen ranks 2nd with 88,000 and with an incidence of 1 to 900.

There are 187,000 Chens in the US, as of 2014. It is the 30th most common last name in California where there are 70,000. 11,300 in Texas, 6,800 Illinois, 5,900 Maryland. New Jersey was undercounted with data missing; New York had 5,400.

In Canada there are 32,900 Chens; 16,600 Ontario and 11,000 British Columbia.

Chen is usually one of the top 5 common Asian last names and top 3 most common Chinese in the US.

Other pronunciations and transliteration

 Chen, used in Mandarin
 Dan, used in Thailand
 Dunn, used in Hokkien, Holo
 Chan, used in Cantonese in Hong Kong, Macao, Thailand, Singapore and Malaysia
 Chin, used in Hakka in Singapore and Malaysia and Taishanese in America
 Gin, used in Taishanese
 Jin, used in Korean
 Tan, used in Hokkien, Teochew and Hainanese in Singapore, Malaysia, Indonesia, Philippines, and Thailand
 Tang or Taing, used in Teochew in Cambodia and Thailand. Occasionally in Singapore and Malaysia.
 Ting or Ding, used in Fuzhou
 Trần, Sấn used in Vietnamese
 Zen, used in Shanghainese
 Sen, used as an alternative spelling in Limbu, Limbuwan

Notable people surnamed 陳 / 陈
This list includes Chen, Chan, Chin, Tran, Tan, Tang and other common spellings of 陈

Historical figures
 Chen Baxian, also known as Emperor Wu of Chen, founding emperor of the Chen dynasty during the Northern and Southern dynasties period
 Chen Biao, military general of Eastern Wu during the Three Kingdoms period
 Chen Bozong, also known as Emperor Fei of Chen, third emperor of the Chen dynasty
 Chen Cheng, Ming diplomat known for his overland journeys into Central Asia
 Chen Dao, military general of Shu Han during the Three Kingdoms period
 Chen De'an, also known Śramaṇa Zhiyi, fourth patriarch of the Tiantai school in Chinese Buddhism
 Chen Deng (204–237), military general and politician of the late Eastern Han dynasty
 Chen Di, Ming philologist, strategist, and traveler
 Chen Gong, advisor to the warlord Lu Bu during the late Eastern Han dynasty
 Chen Hongmou (1696–1771), Qing official, scholar and philosopher, widely regarded as a model official of the Qing dynasty.
 Chen Huacheng (1776–1842), Jiangnan admiral, the highest rank in the Qing Imperial Navy and was regarded as a national hero
 Chen Hugong, also known as Duke Hu of Chen, founder for the State of Chen during the Zhou dynasty
 Chen Hui / Chen Yi (602–664), also known as Master Xuanzang, Buddhist monk, scholar, traveller, and translator, known for his epoch-making contributions to Chinese Buddhism and the travelogue of his journey to India during the Tang dynasty period
 Chen Jiao, Empress Chen of Wu (孝武陳皇后) and the first wife of Emperor Wu of Han
 Chen Li (1810–1882), Qing scholar of the evidential research school, known for his contributions to historical Chinese phonology
 Chen Li, second and last emperor of Chen Han in late Yuan dynasty, and founded Yangsan Jin clan in Korea
 Chen Lin, Ming general and navy admiral, commander-in-chief of the Battle of Noryang and led Ming Navy to win the Imjin War, founderof Gwangdong Jin clan in Korea
 Chen Lin, Eastern Han official, scholar and poet, one of the "Seven Scholars of Jian'an"
 Chen Menglei, Qing scholar-writer, also the chief editor and compiler of Gujin Tushu Jicheng
 Chen Ping, chancellor of the early Western Han dynasty and adviser of Emperor Gaozu of Han
 Chen Qun, official of Cao Wei during Three Kingdoms period and initiated the nine-rank system for civil service nomination
 Chen Tanqian, Emperor Wen of Chen, second emperor of the Chen dynasty
 Chen Sheng, leader of the Chen Sheng Wu Guang uprising, the first uprising against the Qin dynasty
 Chen Shi, military general of Shu Han during the Three Kingdoms period
 Chen Shou (233–297), historian and author in the early Jin dynasty, best known for his historical text Records of the Three Kingdoms
 Chen Shubao, also known as Houzhu of Chen, fifth and last emperor of the Chen dynasty
 Chen Shuda, imperial prince of the Chen dynasty and chancellor of the Tang dynasty
 Chen Tai, military general and official of Cao Wei during the Three Kingdoms period
 Chen Tang, military general of the Western Han dynasty, famous during the Han–Xiongnu War
 Chen Tianbao, former fisherman turned navy commander of the Tay Son dynasty in Vietnam
 Chen Tuan, regarded as a Taoist Immortal, who created and used sleeping qigong methods of internal alchemical cultivation, and also a grand martial artist who created the Liuhebafa technique
 Chen Wangting (1580–1660), commander of the Wen County garrison during the late Ming dynasty, who founded Chen-style t'ai chi ch'uan
 Chen Weisong (1626–1682), first of the great Ci and Pianwen poets during the Qing dynasty, leader and founder of the Yangxian poetry school
 Chen Wenlong (1232–1277), scholarly general during the final years of the Southern Song dynasty, was later deified as City God of Fuzhou and Putian during the Ming dynasty
 Chen Wu, military general who served under the warlord Sun Ce and Sun Quan during the late Eastern Han dynasty
 Chen Xu, Emperor Xuan of Chen, fourth emperor of the Chen dynasty
 Chen Yan, governor of the Fujian Circuit during the late Tang dynasty
 Chen Youliang, founding emperor of Chen Han in the late Yuan dynasty
 Chen Yuanyuan, leading figure in the Suzhou kunqu and concubine of Wu Sangui
 Chen Zhaoyin (1047–1101), also known as Master Qingshui, Chan Buddhist monk during the Northern Song from Anxi County of Quanzhou and was worshipped as a deity in Southern Fujian region and among Chinese diaspora communities
 Chen Zi'ang, prominent poet and important advisor to the Empress Wu Zetian of the Tang dynasty, well known for his collection of thirty-eight poems "Ganyu"
 Chen Zhen, Minister of the Guards in Shu Han during Three Kingdoms period
 Chen Zheng (616–677), military general of the Tang dynasty
 Empress Chen / Empress Xiaojiesu, first empress to the Jiajing Emperor of the Ming dynasty
 Tan Goan-kong (657–711), Tang military general and official who was honoured as the "Sacred Duke, founder of Zhangzhou" 
 Trần Cảnh (1218–1277), also known as Trần Thái Tông, first emperor of the Trần dynasty and reigned Đại Việt (1226–1258)
 Trần Ngỗi (1375–1410), also known as Giản Định Đế, founder and emperor of the Later Trần dynasty
 Trần Quốc Tuấn (1228–1300), royal prince, statesman and military commander during the Trần dynasty, managed to repelled two major Mongol invasions in the late 13th century, worshipped and revered as national hero
 Trần Thừa (1184–1234), head of the Trần clan and high-ranking mandarin during the Lý dynasty
 Trần Thủ Độ (1194–1264), Grand Chancellor and Regent of the Emperor during the Trần dynasty

Dynasties and states
 Rulers of Chen (state) during the Zhou dynasty period, where Taoism originated
 Rulers of the Chen dynasty during the Northern and Southern dynasties period
 Rulers of Chen Han during the late Yuan dynasty period
 Rulers of the Trần dynasty that ruled over Đại Việt (also known as )
 Rulers of the Later Trần dynasty that ruled over Đại Việt

Modern figures
Note: this list is primarily ordered by spelling of the surname, secondarily ordered by given name commonly used in English, regardless of name order.
 Agnes Chan (born 1955), Hong Kong singer and UNICEF Goodwill Ambassador
 Alexandre Chan (born 1942), Brazilian architect, was described as "one of Brazil's leading architects", best known for designing the President Juscelino Kubitschek Bridge and the Bridge of Knowledge
 Andy Chan Ho-tin (born 1990), Hong Kong political activist
 Ceajer "KC" Chan Ka-keung (born 1957), former Secretary for Financial Services and the Treasury in Hong Kong
 Cheryl Chan Wei Ling (born 1976), Singaporean politician and businesswoman
 Chan Choy Siong (1931–1981), Singaporean politician and activist for women's rights in Singapore
 Daniel Chan Hiu-tung (born 1975), Hong Kong singer, songwriter and actor
 Danny Chan Pak-Keung (1958–1993), Hong Kong actor, singer and composer
 Eason Chan Yick Shun (born 1974), Hong Kong actor and singer
 Frankie Chan Fan-kei (born 1951), Hong Kong martial arts actor, director, producer and composer
 Isabel Chan (born 1979), Chinese actress based in Hong Kong
 Jason Chan (disambiguation), several people, including:
Jason Chan Chi-san (born 1977), Hong Kong actor and television presenter
 Jason Chan Keng-Kwin (born 1971), Malaysian-Australian actor
Jason Chan Pak-Yu (born 1983), Hong Kong Canadian singer
 Jason Chan (born 1984), former Papua New Guinea international rugby league footballer
 Jason Chan (born 1996), Canadian-Australian ice dancer and 2019 Australian national senior champion
 Jason Chan (born 1991), Chinese Canadian video game player best known for streaming Hearthstone on Twitch
 Johnny Chan (born 1957), Chinese-American professional poker player
 Jordan Chan Siu-Chun (born 1967), Hong Kong actor and singer
 Kelly Chan Kum Seng (1956–1998), Singaporean windsurfer, ranked number one in Raceboard Lightweight class by International Boardsailing Association in 1992
 Kim Chan (1917–2008), Chinese-American actor and producer
 Leighton Chan (born 1961), American medical researcher and rehabilitation physician, Chief of the Rehabilitation Medicine Department at the National Institutes of Health Clinical Center
 Margaret Chan (born 1947), Chinese-Canadian physician, director of World Health Organization
 Monica Chan Fat-yung (born 1966), Hong Kong actress and winner of Miss Hong Kong 1989
 Moses Chan Ho (born 1971), Hong Kong actor and model
 Patrick Chan (born 1990), Canadian figure skater, 2018 Olympic gold medallist in the team event
 Priscilla Chan (born 1985), American philanthropist, former pediatrician, co-founder and CEO of Meta Platforms
 Priscilla Chan Wai-han (born 1965), Hong Kong singer
 Ruco Chan Chin-pang (born 1977), Hong Kong actor and singer
 Frank Chan Fan (born 1958), former Secretary for Transport and Housing in Hong Kong
 Sophia Chan Siu-chee (born 1958), former Secretary for Food and Health in Hong Kong
 Chan Kin-man, One of the founders of the Occupy Central
 Chan Sek Keong (born 1937), Singapore's third Chief Justice of Singapore (2006–2012)
 Chan Seng Onn (born 1954), Singaporean judge, served as High Court judge since 2007
 Chan Siu Wing (born 1993), Hong Kong professional basketball player
 Chan Tseng-hsi (1923–1986), Hong Kong billionaire who founded Hang Lung Group, Harvard T.H. Chan School of Public Health named after him, sons Gerald Chan and Ronnie Chan
 Tony Fan-Cheong Chan (born 1952), Chinese-American mathematician, President of the King Abdullah University of Science and Technology
 Vincy Chan (born 1982), Hong Kong-Singaporean Cantopop singer
 William Chan Wai-ting (born 1985), Hong Kong singer, dancer and actor
 Chan Wing-tsit (1901–1994), Chinese scholar and professor best known for his studies of Chinese philosophy and W.T. Chan Fellowships Program was established by the Lingnan Foundation in his memory
 Chan Yau-Man (born 1952), Malaysian-American table tennis player, technology executive and reality TV contestant
 José Antonio Chang (born 19 May 1958), former Prime Minister of Peru<ref name="HeSaiChen">Xinhua News Agency.  15 September 2010. Accessed 22 December 2016.</ref>
Aaron Chen (disambiguation), several people
 Anthony Chen (born 1984), Singaporean film director, screenwriter and film producer who won Caméra d'Or award in Cannes Film Festival
 Apollo Chen (born 1957), Taiwanese legislator
 Arthur Y. Chen, Minister of Public Construction Commission of the Republic of China (1995–1996)
 Chen Bolin / Wilson Chen (born 1983), Taiwanese actor and won the Golden Bell Award for Best Actor in 2011
 Bruce Chen (born 1977), Panamanian Major League Baseball player
 Cheer Chen Chi-chen (born 1975), Taiwanese singer and songwriter
 Chen Changwen (born 1944), Chairman and CEO of Lee and Li, was formerly the secretary of Straits Exchange Foundation and the president of the Red Cross Society of the Republic of China
 Chen Cheng (1897–1965), Chinese politician and general, Vice President and Premier of the Republic of China
 Chen Chi-chung (born 1966), Minister of Council of Agriculture of the Republic of China, distinguished professor at National Chung Hsing University (2008–2016)
 Chen Chien-jen, (born 1951) Former Vice President of the Republic of China (Taiwan)
 Chen In-chin, Taiwanese politician, Chairperson of Central Election Commission of the Republic of China (2017–2018)
 Chen Chih-ching (born 1952), Taiwanese politician, Minister of Council of Agriculture of the Republic of China (2016)
 Chen Chih-Ping (1906–1984), Diplomat for the Republic of China from 1920s through mid-1970s
 Chen Chin-jun (born 1956), Taiwanese politician, Secretary-General of the Executive Yuan (2007–2008)
 Chen Chi-ting (born 1999), Taiwanese badminton player
 Christine Chen (born 1968), American journalist, news anchor and CEO of Chen Communications
 Chen Chung-shin, General Secretary of the Boy Scouts of China and was awarded the 157th Bronze Wolf, the only distinction of the World Organization of the Scout Movement, awarded by the World Scout Committee for exceptional services to world Scouting.
 Chen Chunying, Chemist and professor of chemistry at the National Center for Nanoscience and Technology
 Chen Danian (born 1978), Chinese Internet entrepreneur, founder and CEO of LinkSure
 Chen Deming, former president of Association for Relations Across the Taiwan Straits of the People's Republic of China
 Chen Ding (born 1992), racewalker, 2012 Olympic champion
 Chen Dong (born 1978), PLA fighter pilot and taikonaut
 Doreen Chen, Jamaican politician and MP for Trelawny Southern (1997–2002)
 Chen Duling (born 1993), Chinese actress
 Chen Duxiu (1879–1942), co-founder of the Chinese Communist Party and its first general secretary, leader of China's Trotskyist movement
 Eddy Chen (born 1993), Australian musician and YouTuber of the musical duo TwoSet Violin
 Edison Chen Koon-hei (born 1980), Canadian-born Hong Kong actor, singer, rapper, fashion designer and entrepreneur
 Edmund Chen (born 1961), Singaporean actor and artist during the 1990s and early 2000s
 Edward Chen, (born 1996), Taiwanese actor and singer
 Edward Chen, (born 1945), Hong Kong economist and politician, President of Lingnan University (1995–2007)
 Edward M. Chen (born 1953), American federal judge
 Chen Fake (1887–1957), prominent martial artist of Chen-style t'ai chi ch'uan
 Fala Chen (born 1982), Hong Kong-born American actress and singer
 Chen Fu-hai (born 1963), Magistrate of Kinmen County, Taiwan (2014–2018)
 Chen Fushou (1932–2020), Indonesian badminton gold medalist, later became the head coach of the China national women's badminton team, which won 25 team or individual world championships under his leadership
 Chen Gang (disambiguation), several people
 Chen Geng, PLA senior general
 Chen Guangbiao, founder and chairman of Jiangsu Huangpu Renewable Resources Limited Company
 Chen Guangcheng (born 1971), Chinese civil rights activist in PRC
 Chen Guangfu (1880–1976), Shanghai-based Chinese banker and State Councillor, founder of the first modern Chinese savings bank
 Chen Guangyi, PRC politician and former governor of Gansu
 Chen Guanrong, mathematician who made contributions to Chaos theory
 Chen Guofu (1892–1951), Chinese politician in the Republic of China, Governor of Jiangsu Province (1933–1937)
 H. T. Chen (1947–2022), American dancer and choreographer
 Chen Hao (born 1979), PRC actress, singer, and model
 Chen He (born 1985), actor noted for playing Zeng Xiaoxian in the romantic comedy television series IPartment
 Chen Hong (born 1968), PRC actress and film producer
 Chen Hong (born 1979), PRC former badminton player
 Chen Hsiung-wen (born 1954), Minister of Labor of the Republic of China (2014–2016)
 Chen Hsueh-sheng (born 1952), Magistrate of Lienchiang County, Taiwan (2001–2009)
 Chen Hualan (born 1969), Veterinary virologist best known for researching animal epidemic diseases
Jason Chen (disambiguation), several people
 Chen Jianbin (born 1970), actor, most notable for the portrayal of Cao Cao in the 2010 television series Three Kingdoms
 Chen Jiebing, Chinese-American musician who specialises in erhu Chen Jin, actress noted for her roles as Wang Ruhui in the film Roaring Across the Horizon
 Chen Jin (born 1986), former world men's singles champion in badminton
 Chen Jingguang, Chinese-American chemical engineer and Thayer Lindsley Professor of Chemical Engineering at Columbia University
 Chen Jingrun (1933–1996), mathematician, known for Chen prime and Chen's theorem
 Chen Jinn-lih, Vice President of Control Yuan (2008–2014)
 Chen Jintao (1870–1939), chief financial officer and head of currency reform in the Republic of China, also founded Bank of China
 Chen Jiongming (1878–1933), Hailufeng Hokkien revolutionary figure in the early period of the Republic of China
 Jirayu Tangsrisuk (born 1993), Thai actor, singer and model
 Chen Jiun-Shyan, American engineering professor at University of California, San Diego
 Joan Chen (born 1961), Chinese-American actress and film director
 Joseph Zen Ze-kiun (born 1931), Roman Catholic cardinal and former Bishop of Hong Kong
 Joyce Chen (1917–1994), Chinese-American chef, author and television personality
 Julie Chen (born 1970), American television personality, news anchor and producer
 Chen Kaige (born 1952), film director who won the Palme d'Or at 1993 Cannes Film Festival
 Kanok Ratwongsakul (born 1963), well-known journalist, Senior Vice President of the Nation Multimedia Group
 Karen Chen (born 1999), American figure skater, 2022 Olympic Games team event silver medalist
 Katherine Chen Yi-Ning, Taiwanese communications official and professor
 Kawee Tanjararak (born 1980), Thai singer and actor
 Kelly Chen Wai-lam (born 1972), Hong Kong actress and singer
 Chen Kenichi (born 1956), Japanese chef on the syndicated TV program Iron Chef, nicknamed "The Szechuan Sage"
 Chen Kenmin (1912–1990), Prominent Chinese chef in Japan, father of Chen Kenichi
 Chen Kuang-fu (born 1955), Magistrate of Penghu County, Taiwan (2014–2018)
 Chen Lanhee (born 1978), American policy advisor, attorney, and academic
 Chen Lifu (1900–2001), Chinese politician and anti-communist of the Republic of China, Minister of Education (1938–1944)
 Chen Linong (born 2000), Taiwanese singer and actor, former member of Nine Percent
 Chen Liping (born 1965), Singaporean actress
 Chen Lu (born 1976), PRC figure skater and 1995 World Champion
 Chen Mei-Ann (born 1973), American orchestra conductor and musician
 Chen Mengjia (1911–1966), scholar and archaeologist, considered the foremost authority on oracle bones and Professor of Chinese at Tsinghua University
 Chen Mingren (1903–1974), First Corps Commander and the provincial chairman of the Hunan Provincial Government during ROC period, later become one of the founding member of PLA during PRC period
 Napa Kiatwanchai (born 1967), Thai professional boxer (born as Suwit Sae-tang)
 Nathan Chen (born 1999), American figure skater, 2022 Olympic champion and gold medalist
 Chen Pehong (born 1957), Taiwanese-American businessman, chairman of the board, president and chief executive officer of BroadVision 
 Peter Chen Pin-Shan (born 1947), computer scientist, inventor of the Entity-Relationship Model
 Chen Qingchen, PRC badminton player
 Chen Qingping (1795–1868), Influential martial artist and teacher of taijiquan
 Chen Qiufan (born 1981), science fiction writer, columnist, and scriptwriter
 Robert Chen (born 1969), Taiwanese-born violinist and Concertmaster of the Chicago Symphony Orchestra
 Roger H. Chen (born 1950s), Taiwanese-born American businessman, founder of the 99 Ranch Market supermarket chain
 Chen Rui (:zh:陈睿), internet entrepreneur, billionaire, and CEO of Bilibili
 Chen Saijuan, hematologist and molecular biologist with a research focus on leukemia cytogenetics
 Chen Shaoguo (born 1971), PRC former racewalker
 Chen Hongyu (born 1978), former Malaysian national badminton player and actor based in Singapore
 Shane Chen, Chinese-American inventor and entrepreneur (e.g. invented the self-balancing scooter)
 Chen Shi-Zheng, New York-based theater and film director
 Chen Show Mao (born 1961), former Member of Parliament in Singapore, Rhodes Scholar and retired lawyer and politician
 Chen Shui-bian (born 1950), President of the Republic of China (2000–2008)
 Chen Shui-tsai (born 1948), First Magistrate of Kinmen County (1993–2001)
 Chen Shyh-kwei (born 1952), Minister of the Overseas Community Affairs Council of the Executive Yuan in Taiwan (2013–2016)
 Chen Sicheng (born 1978), actor, director and screenwriter, is known for his leading roles in the films A Young Prisoner's Revenge and Spring Fever Chen Sisi (1938–2007), born Chen Limei, Chinese film and theater actress
 Steven Shih Chen (born 1978), Taiwanese-American Internet entrepreneur and co-founder of YouTube
 Steve Chen (born 1944), Taiwanese supercomputer designer and entrepreneur
 Surachai Danwattananusorn (born 1942), Thai political activist
 Jin Sun-Yu (born 1988), South Korean short-track speed skater, triple Olympic Champion from 2006 and three-time Overall World Champion
 Chen Tanqiu (1896–1943), founding member of Chinese Communist Party and was later executed
 Terry Chen (born 1975), Canadian film and television actor
 Chen Tianhua, Chinese revolutionary, who helped Sun Yat-sen found the Tongmenghui in 1905
 Chen Tianqiao, businessman
 Chen Tianwen (born 1963), Singaporean actor 
 Chen Tze-chung (born 1958), Taiwanese professional golfer also known as T. C. Chen
 Chen Wei, Epidemiologist and virologist specializing in biodefense
 Chen Wei (born 1969), PRC dissident and human rights activist
 Chen Wei-Yin (born 1985), Taiwanese professional baseball pitcher
 Chen Wei-zen (born 1953), Minister of the Interior in Taiwan (2014–2016)
 Chen Wen Hsi (1906–1991), Singaporean artist, known for his avant-garde Chinese paintings
 Chen Wen-hsien (born 1958), Taiwanese politician and television commentator
 Chen Xiangming, sociologist, founding dean and director of urban and global studies and director of the Center for Urban and Global Studies at Trinity College in Hartford
 Chen Xiao, actor and model
 Chen Xiaohong, economist and serves as the Malcolm K. Brachman Professor of Economics at Yale University
 Chen Xiaowang, 19th generation lineage holder of Chen-style taijiquan
 Chen Xiaoxu (1965–2007), former actress who ordained as Bhikkhuni in Baiguoxinglong Temple monastic name Miao Zhen
 Chen Xinghan, video game designer and co-founder of Thatgamecompany
 Chen Yi (1883–1950), Chief Executive of Taiwan Province
 Chen Yi (1901–1972), Chinese communist military commander and politician, Mayor of Shanghai and Foreign Minister
 Chen Yi (born 1953), Chinese-American violinist and composer of contemporary classical music
 Chen Yinke (1890–1969), historian and fellow of Academia Sinica, considered one of the most original and creative historians in 20th century China
 Chen Yonglin, former PRC diplomat who defected to Australia in 2005
 Chen Yu (born 1980), Chinese badminton player
 Chen Yuan (1880–1971), known as one of the "Four Greatest Historians" of Modern China
 Chen Yuan, economist who served as the Chairman of the China Development Bank (1998–2013)
 Chen Yuh-chang (born 1955), Chairperson of the Financial Supervisory Commission of the Executive Yuan (2010–2013)
 Chen Yumei (1910–1985), Chinese film actress and singer of the 1920s and 1930s.
 Chen Yun, PRC politician, in the 1980s and 1990s considered second most powerful leader after Deng Xiaoping
 Chen Yunshang (1919–2016), Chinese film actress and singer of the 1930s and 1940s
 Chen Yuqi (also known as Yukee Chen, born 1992), actress known for her supporting roles in The Princess Weiyoung and Ashes of Love
 Chen Zaiyan (born 1971), artist in the Yangjiang Group collective
 Chen Zhi, Professor of classical guitar at the Central Conservatory of Music
 Chen Zhongwei (1929–2004), expert in orthopedic surgery and microsurgery, one of the pioneers of the process of reattaching severed limbs
 Chen Zhu (born 1953), PRC hematologist, molecular biologist, and politician, former Minister of Health
 Chern Shiing-Shen (1911–2004), Chinese-American mathematician, known for Chern–Gauss–Bonnet theorem, Chern class, Chern–Simons theory, etc.
 Arthur Chin (1913–1997), Chinese-American fighter ace in the Second Sino-Japanese War, recognized as the United States' first ace in World War II
 Lynda Chin (born 1968), Chinese-American cancer genomic scientist
 Marcus Chin (born 1953), Singaporean host, actor and singer
 Ming Chin (born 1942), Associate Justice of the California Supreme Court
 Chin Sophonpanich (1908–1988), Thai entrepreneur who founded Bangkok Bank
 Chatri Sophonpanich (1934–2018), Thai businessman, son of Chin Sophonpanich
 Chartsiri Sophonpanich (1959), Thai banker, son of Chatri Sophonpanich, grandson of Chin Sophonpanich
 Chin Tet Yung, former Singapore's Member of Parliament
 Vincent "Randy" Chin (1937–2003), Jamaican record producer and label owner, founder of VP Records
 Chun Afong (1825–1906), Businessman and philanthropist who built a business empire in Hawaii
 Tan Aik Huang (born 1946), former Malaysian All-England Open men's singles champion
 Tan Aik Quan (born 1990), Malaysian badminton player who has achieved as world number 15 in the mixed doubles. 
 Tan Ban Eng Melvyn (born 1956), Singapore-born British classical pianist, noted for his study of historical performance practice
 Tan Boen Soan (1905–1952), Indonesian writer and journalist
 Tan Boo Liat (1875–1934), Singaporean businessman and philanthropist, great-grandson of Tan Tock Seng
 Tan Boon Heong (born 1987), former World No.1 Malaysian professional badminton player in men's doubles event
 Tan Boon Teik (1929–2012), former Attorney-General of Singapore
 Tan Boon Wah (born 1975), Singaporean songwriter and practicing real estate lawyer
 Tan Caktiong Tony (born 1953), Filipino billionaire businessman, founder and chairman of Jollibee Foods Corporation
 Tan Chay Yan (1870–1916), Malaysian Peranakan Chinese rubber plantation merchant and philanthropist, grandson of Tan Tock Seng
 Tan Chee Yioun Vincent (born 1952), Malaysian businessman, investor and the founder of Berjaya Corporation Berhad
 Tan Cheng Bock (born 1940), Singaporean politician and doctor 
 Tan Cheng Han Singaporean lawyer, senior counsel and legal academic, Dean of the City University of Hong Kong School of Law
 Tan Cheng Lock (1883–1960), founderof the Malayan Chinese Association (MCA) and an important figure during the independence of Malaya
 Tan Chin Hwee (born 1971), Singaporean businessman and professor, Asia-Pacific chief executive officer of Trafigura 
 Tan Chin Siong Sam (born 1958), Singaporean politician
 Tan Chin Tuan (1908–2005) Singaporean Peranakan banker and philanthropist
 Tan Chorh Chuan, Singaporean college administrator and professor, President of the National University of Singapore (2008–2017) and director of medical dervices in Ministry of Health (2000–2004)
 Tan Chor Jin (1966–2009), Singaporean gang lord and murderer
 Tan Chong Tee (1916–2012), Chinese resistance fighter based in Singapore and Malaya during World War II
 Tan Chui Mui (born 1978), Malaysian filmmaker
 Tan Chye Cheng (1911–1991), Singaporean lawyer and politician, Member of the Legislative Council (1948–1955)
 Tan Eng Goan (1802–1872), first Majoor der Chinezen ("Major of the Chinese") of Batavia (1837–1865)
Tan Eng Yan 陈英燕, Singaporean murder victim and former fruit stall helper
 Tan Giok Lan Mely (born 1930), Indonesian sociologist
 Tan Gin Ho (1880–1941), Indonesian writer and scion of the influential Tan family of Cirebon
 Tan Hiok Nee (1827–1902), Major China of Johor and leader of Ngee Heng Kongsi
 Tan Hoan Liong (1938–2009), Indonesian–Dutch chess player, the first Indonesian and one of the first Asian chess players to hold the International Master title
 Tan Hock Eng (born 1952), Malaysian business executive, philanthropist and the CEO of Broadcom Inc.
 Tan Hong Djien, Indonesian football player, played in the 1938 FIFA World Cup
 Tan Howe Liang (born 1933), Singaporean weightlifter and also the first Singaporean to win an Olympic medal
 Tan Jiak Kim (1859–1917), Singapore Peranakan merchant, political activist, philanthropist and co-founder of the Straits Chinese British Association, was awarded the Order of St Michael and St George in 1912
 Tan Jee Say (born 1954), Singaporean politician and former civil servant
 Tan Joe Hok (born 1937), Indonesian badminton player
 Tan Joon Liang Josephus (born 1979), Singaporean criminal defense lawyer known for his pro bono work
 Tan Kah Kee (1874–1961), Chinese businessman, community leader and philanthropist in Singapore and China 
 Tan Kee Soon (1803–1857), first Kangchu and Kapitan China of Tebrau, leader of Ngee Heng Kongsi and Anti-Qing fighter
 Tan Keong Choon (1916–2015) Singapore industrialist, community leader and philanthropist
 Tan Keng Yam Tony (born 1940), seventh President of Singapore
 Tan Keong Saik (1850–1909), Singaporean businessman who contributed in setting up Chinese Chamber of Commerce and advocate of education and equality of rights for women
 Tan Kheng Boon Eugene (born 1970), associate professor of law at Singapore Management University, Nominated Member of Parliament (2012–2014)
 Tan Khoen Swie (1883/1894–1953), Indonesian publisher
 Tan Kian Meng (born 1994), Malaysian badminton player who specializes in doubles events 
 Tan Kiat How (born 1977), Singaporean politician, Senior Minister of State for National Development and Communications and Information
 Tan Kim Ching (1829–1892), served as Kapitan China of the Chinese community, was also the consul for Japan, Siam and Russia, and was a member of the Royal Court of Siam
 Tan Kim Seng (1805–1864), Chinese community leader (Hokkien) and first magistrate of Chinese descent in Singapore
 Tan Kin Lian (born 1948), Singaporean businessman
 Tan Kok Ming Desmond (born 1970), Singaporean politician and former Brigadier-General in Singapore Armed Forces
 Tan Kok Wai (born 1957), Malaysia's Member of Parliament and National Chairman of the Democratic Action Party
 Tan Koon Swan (born 1940), Fifth president of the Malaysian Chinese Association
 Tan Lark Sye (1897–1972), prominent businessman and philanthropist, founded Nanyang University in the 1950s
 Tan Lee Meng (born 1948), Senior Judge of the Supreme Court of Singapore (2015–2021)
 Tan Lian Hoe (born 1958), former Malaysia's Member of Parliament
 Tan Liong Houw, Indonesian football player, participated in the 1956 Olympics in Melbourne
 Tan Lip-Bu (born 1959), Malaysian-born American executive and entrepreneur, executive chairman of Cadence Design Systems and Chairman of Walden International
 Tan Min Liang (born 1977), Singaporean businessman and internet entrepreneur, the co-founder, CEO and creative director of Razer Inc., the CEO of THX
 Tan Mo Heng, Indonesian football goalkeeper, played in the 1938 FIFA World Cup
Tan Ping Koon (born 1968), Singaporean kidnapper
 Tan Pin Pin (born 1969), Singapore-based film director
 Tan See Han, Indonesian football players, played in the 1938 FIFA World Cup
 Tan Seng Giaw (born 1942), former Malaysian Member of Parliament
 Tan Sheng Hui Alvin (born 1980), Singaporean politician, Minister of State for Culture, Community and Youth, and Trade and Industry since 2020
 Tan Siew Sin (1916–1988), Malaysian longest-serving Minister of Finance and son of Tun Dato' Sir Tan Cheng Lock
 Tan Soo Khoon (born 1949), Singaporean politician, Speaker of the Parliament (1989–2001)
 Tan Soon Neo Jessica (born 1966), Singaporean politician, Deputy Speaker of Parliament since 2020
 Tan Swie Hian (born 1943), Singaporean multidisciplinary artist known for his contemporary Chinese calligraphy, Chinese poetry and contemporary art sculptures
 Tan Tai Yong, Singaporean academic and politician, President of Yale-NUS College since 2017 and Nominated Member of Parliament (2014–2015)
 Tan Teng Chuan Steven (born 1970), Singaporean footballer for Singapore national team during the 1990s
 Tan Tee Beng (born 1972), former Malaysian Member of Parliament
 Tan Teng-pho (1895–1947), Prominent Taiwanese oil painter, whose work was featured in the seventh Imperial Art Exhibition in Japan 
 Tan Tjin Kie (1853–1919), Majoor-titulair der Chinezen, high-ranking bureaucrat, courtier, sugar baron, also the founder and patron of the Confucian revival and Tiong Hoa Hwee Koan in Cirebon
 Tan Tjoei Hock (1908–1984), Indonesian journalist and filmmaker
 Tan Tjoen Tiat (1816–1880), second Majoor der Chinezen ("Major of the Chinese") of Batavia (1865-1879)
 Tan Tock Seng (1798–1850), Leader of Hokkien community, Kapitan China of Singapore and first Asian to be appointed Justice of the Peace
 Tan Twan Eng, Malaysian novelist who won the Man Asian Literary Prize and Walter Scott Prize for Historical Fiction
 Tan Wee Kiong (born 1989), Malaysian badminton player who won the gold medal in the men's doubles and the mixed team event at the 2014 Commonwealth Games.
 Tan Wee Tat (born 1992), Malaysian badminton player
 Tan Wee Gieen (born 1994), Malaysian badminton player
 Tan Wu Meng (born 1975), Singaporean politician and oncologist
 Tan Yee Khan (born 1940), former Malaysian badminton player who won the All-England Open men's doubles championship in 1965 and 1966
 Tan Yinglan (born 1981), Singaporean businessman and writer
 Tan Yueh Ming (1945–2010), also known as Hadi Soesastro, Indonesian economist, political scientist (international relations), founder and former executive director of Centre for Strategic and International Studies (Indonesia)
 Desmond Tan (born 1986), Singaporean actor
 Julie Tan (born 1992), Malaysian born Singaporean actress and model.
 Lucio Tan (born 1934), Filipino-Chinese businessman and owner of Philippine Airlines
 Michael Tan (born 1952), a Chinese Filipino medical anthropologist and the 10th Chancellor of the University of the Philippines Diliman 
 Romeo Tan (born 1985), Singaporean actor 
 Royston Tan (born 1976), Singaporean filmmaker, director, screenwriter, producer and actor
 Sandi Tan (born 1972), Singaporean filmmaker and critic
 Sutanto Tan, Indonesian football player
 Tin Pei Ling (born 1983), Singaporean politician and businesswoman
 Harmony Tan (born 1997), French professional tennis player

 Other 

 Chen Fu Zhen Ren, ancestral deity of Indonesian Chinese residing throughout Banyuwangi Regency, Java, Bali, and Lombok, also worshipped by Balinese and Javanese (Kejawen). 
 Chen Jinggu, Taoist deity and protective goddess of women, children, and pregnancy, also known as Lady Linshui. She is worshipped in Fujian, Taiwan, South China, and across East Asia and Southeast Asia.
 Chen-style taijiquan, Northern Chinese martial art and the original form of Taiji.
 Tran (surname), second most common Vietnamese surname, the Vietnamese spelling of 陳
 Chen (disambiguation)
 Chen Commandery
 The Hebrew surname חן is also spelled Chen.

 Clan temples and associations 
 Tan Si Chong Su, also known as Poh Chiak Keng, built around 1876 in Singapore
 Eng Chuan Tong Tan Kongsi, built around 1878 in Georgetown, Penang, Malaysia

Fictional
Charlie Chan, a fictional detective
Chen, a character in the British science fiction sitcom Red DwarfChan Ho-nam, the fictitious Hong Kong triad boss in the Young and Dangerous film series
Chen Jialuo, protagonist of the Wuxia novel The Book and the SwordDetective Grace Chen, a central character in Martial LawChen, the Holy Knight, a character in the Warcraft III: Reign of Chaos custom map Defense of the AncientsChen Stormstout, an important character in the World of Warcraft: Mists of Pandaria, as well as playable hero in Warcraft III: The Frozen Throne and Heroes of the Storm 
Chen Zhen, a fictional Chinese martial artist and culture hero
Jing-Mei Chen, a Chinese-American physician in the television drama series ER''
Kai Chen, a character from Power Rangers Lost Galaxy.

References

Bibliography

External links

 Chinese surname history: Chen
 CHEN - Chinese Surname Chen2 - Tan, Chan, Chin, Ting 

Chinese-language surnames
Chen (state)
Individual Chinese surnames